The Bagaš was a Serbian noble family that served the Serbian Kingdom and Empire.

History
The word Bagaš is derived from the Old Slavic measurement with the same name.

The family hailed from Kastoria. Some scholars believe that the Bagaš family was originally from Vranje in Serbia while some other scholars believe that historical sources do not confirm it. Some scholars believe the Bagaš family was of Vlach origin.

Members

Antonije Bagaš (Antonios Pagases), nobleman, took monastic vows in Mount Athos between 1356–1366, taking the name Arsenios (Arsenije). He bought and restored the ruined Athonite monastery of Saint Paul with the help of Nikola Radonja and became its abbott.
Nikola Bagaš (Nicholas Baldouin Pagases), nobleman, donated the monastery of Mesonesiotissa near Kastoria, Kastoria, together with villages, churches and other property to the monastery his brother Antonije in 1384. He was married to the daughter of Radoslav Hlapen.

There were several Serbian noblemen to which Antonije and Nikola might be related, such as Baldovin and Župan Maljušat, son of knez Baldovin who controlled region of Vranje. Based on Nikola's surname (Baldovin Bagaš) some scholars concluded that they were indeed related.

References

Sources
Jan Olof Rosenqvist, Interaction and isolation in late Byzantine culture, Google book

 
Eastern Christianity Michael Angold
Through the looking glass: Byzantium through British eyes : papers from the twenty-ninth Spring Symposium of Byzantine Studies, London, March 1995

Further reading
Studi Slavistici : rivista dell'Associazione Italiana degli Slavisti - 2005 - 2 - Recensioni 

 
14th-century Serbian nobility
People of the Serbian Empire